Hiba Aboukhris Benslimane, better known as Hiba Abouk (born 30 October 1986), is a Spanish actress. She is known for her roles in television series, especially that of Fátima in El Príncipe.

Biography
Hiba Abouk was born in Madrid, the youngest of four siblings. She is of Tunisian and Libyan descent. Her parents had earlier settled in Spain after emigrating from Tunisia. Hiba is passionate about Flamenco. She studied at the French Lycée in Madrid until age 18. Later she studied Arabic philology, and she earned a licentiate degree in drama from the RESAD. 

After one appearance in an episode of television series El síndrome de Ulíses in 2008, credited as Hiba Hadoukis, her acting career really started in 2010, on La isla de los nominados, a comedy series broadcast by the Spanish TV channel Cuatro. It was followed, in 2011, by an episodic role in the Spanish adaptation of Cheers and the role of Guadalupe in El corazón del océano which, however, was not aired until 2014. In 2012 she became part of the regular cast of the comedy series of Antena 3 Con el culo al aire, in which she participated in the first two seasons. In February 2014, she made her debut in El Príncipe, a crime drama series aired on Telecinco that is usually watched by more than five million viewers and in which she plays her first leading role.

Personal life
Hiba Abouk is married to football player Achraf Hakimi. The couple have two sons.

Filmography

Films

Television

Awards
2014 – Cosmopolitan Beauty Awards, women's beauty icon.

References

Further reading
  "'Que no me digan que no se puede, porque yo lo tenía todo en contra: mujer, árabe, sin un duro...'" (Archive). El Mundo. 4 August 2014.

Actresses from Madrid
1986 births
Living people
Spanish people of Tunisian descent
Spanish people of Libyan descent
Association footballers' wives and girlfriends
Spanish people of Romani descent